This is a list of primary aluminium smelters in the world. Primary production is the process by which alumina is smelted to pure aluminum metal. Secondary production is the process of recycling aluminum scrap into aluminum that can be used again. Capacity here refers to metric tonnes of output aluminum. The list is incomplete and missing some data.

See also
 List of alumina refineries
 List of countries by aluminium production

References

External links
Primary Aluminum Smelters of the World

 
aluminium smelters